Smith-Green Community Schools is a public school district serving the town of Churubusco, Indiana. The name derives from the townships it serves: Smith Township in Whitley County and Green Township in Noble County. It has 1,186 students as of the 2020–2021 school year and includes two schools: Churubusco Junior-Senior High School (6th-12th grades) and Churubusco Elementary School (PK-5 Grades). The schools are housed in the same complex but independently administered.

References

External links
 
 Official Board Website: https://www.sgcs.k12.in.us/page/school-board-of-education

School districts in Indiana
Education in Whitley County, Indiana
Education in Noble County, Indiana
School districts established in 1923
1923 establishments in Indiana